Tephritis hyoscyami  is a species of fly in the family Tephritidae , the gall flies. It is found in the  Palearctic. The larvae feed on Carduus crispus, Carduus nutans,  and Cirsium species.

Distribution
United Kingdom & Scandinavia South to France, Romania & Caucasus, East Russia, China.

References

Tephritinae
Insects described in 1758
Diptera of Asia
Diptera of Europe
Taxa named by Carl Linnaeus